Crystal Mountains (Monts de Cristal) is a group of low mountains (or hills, as all peaks are below 1,000m) inland of the Atlantic coast of Equatorial Guinea, Gabon, the Republic of the Congo, the Democratic Republic of the Congo, and Angola. It is the edge of the interior Woleu-Ntem Plateau against the coastal lowland which has a steep descent deeply cut by streams and waterfalls.

Part of the area is preserved in Gabon as the Crystal Mountains National Park. Mont Mbilan is the highest point (about 925m) in the park. Seni Mont (611m) receives the highest rainfall in all of Gabon (350 cm/year).

Fauna 
Two species of frogs, Leptopelis crystallinoron and Leptodactylodon stevarti, are only known from the Crystal Mountains.

References

Mountain ranges of Equatorial Guinea
Mountain ranges of Gabon
Mountain ranges of the Democratic Republic of the Congo
Mountain ranges of the Republic of the Congo
Mountain ranges of Angola